Gestalt Publishing is an Australian independent graphic novel publishing house. They primarily publish Australian graphic novelists, and have an ethos of supporting and developing emerging talent.

History 
The company was officially founded in Applecross, Western Australia, in 2005 by Wolfgang Bylsma and Skye Ogden, although they had previously been involved in creating, editing and publishing underground and editorial comics since the early-1990s.

Gestalt operates out of Perth, Western Australia. However, the company routinely travels to other parts of Australia for conventions and festivals.

To date, Gestalt Publishing have published such notable books as The Deep: Here Be Dragons, Changing Ways, Eldritch Kid, Unmasked and Flinch.

Gestalt have published the work of many well-known creators, including Shaun Tan, Tom Taylor, Justin Randall, Colin Wilson and Terry Dowling.

In 2013, a documentary called Comic Book Heroes was made about the company’s founders and core talent, and their efforts to establish a following in the US market.

In 2018 and 2019, Gestalt's Editor-in-Chief, Wolfgang Bylsma, worked with the Indigenous Literacy Foundation to mentor and support a group of young Indigenous comic writers and artists based in Mparntwe (Alice Springs) called ‘Stick Mob Studios’. Gestalt published three of Stick Mob Studio’s comics – Storm Warning, Exo Dimensions, and Mixed Feelings. Production is underway for follow-up volumes of each title, with Comics On Country, Inc now supporting the creators.

Gestalt also collaborated with Big hART to produce and print physical editions of the comic series Neomad. The comic was originally produced as part of their Yijala Yala project, which worked with the Roebourne community to create videos, games, performances, and interactive comics. The graphic novel went on to receive the Gold Ledger Award in 2016.

In 2022, one of the owners of Gestalt Wolfgang Bylsma established Comics On Country as a not-for-profit platform to help support First Nations creators in telling their stories through comics.

Indigiverse 
In 2022, Gestalt announced that it would be partnering with Comics On Country, Inc, and Ice Cream Productions to create an Aboriginal superhero universe under the ‘Indigiverse’ banner. This will consist of multiple comic book series, all of which will feature Aboriginal Australian characters and Lore.

The first comic series under the Indigiverse imprint is Dark Heart, written by Gooniyandi-Miriuwung Gajerrong man Scott Wilson with art by Katie Houghton-Ward and Justin Randall. The first issue was released in July 2022. The comic features an ‘Elder Protector’ who guards the world against beings of darkness. The second issue is scheduled for release in November 2022, with production underway on another two comic series to see publication in 2023.

Books 
 His Dream of the Skyland
 Changing Ways: Book 1
 Changing Ways: Book 2
 Changing Ways: Book 3, Chapter 1
 The Deep Vol. 1: Here Be Dragons
 The Deep Vol. 2: The Vanishing Island
 Torn
 Lark Case Files: Black City
 Lark Case Files: Devil City
 Neomad
 Exo Dimensions Vol. 1
 Mixed Feelings Vol. 1
 Storm Warning Vol. 1
 Vowels
 Eldritch Kid: Bone War
 Eldritch Kid: Whisky and Hate
 Karnak
 Plato's Allegory of the Cave
 Rombies
 The Example
 The More Things Change
 Proud Heart
 Believe
 MIDAS
 Fly
 Sebastian Hawks
 Waldo's Hawaiian Holiday
 Unmasked Vol.1: Going Straight Is No Way To Die
 Unmasked: Caddy Full of Blood
 Wastelander Panda Vol. 1: Exile
 Walled City Book 1: His Dream of the Skyland
 Walled City Book 2: Nocturne
 Flinch
 Lustration Vol. 1
 Character Sketches
 Khulan
 Talgard: Tome One
 Talgard: Tome Two
 Flock Book One: Warbird
 Cleverman Vol. 1
 Cleverman Vol. 2
 Dark Heart Vol. 1

References

External links

Flinch Flinch Website
Tom Taylor on Flinch and The Example, Cool Shite
Comics On Country official site 
Stick Mob Studios official site

2005 establishments in Australia
Publishing companies established in 2005
Australian comics
Book publishing companies of Australia
Comic book publishing companies of Australia